is a side-scrolling beat-'em-up video game produced by Capcom. Originally released as an arcade game in 1989, it was the seventh title released for the CP System hardware. Set in the fictional Metro City, the game lets the player control one of three street fighters: former pro wrestler and city mayor Mike Haggar, expert brawler Cody Travers, and modern-day ninja Guy. The trio set out to rescue Jessica (Haggar's daughter and Cody's girlfriend) when she is kidnapped by the Mad Gear Gang.

The game began development as a sequel to the original Street Fighter released in 1987, under the working title  but the genre was switched from a fighting game to a beat 'em up and the title was changed to Final Fight following the success of Double Dragon. Final Fight was ported to various home computers and consoles, including the ZX Spectrum, Super NES and Sega CD.

It became a major commercial success in arcades, selling 30,000 arcade units worldwide while becoming the highest-grossing arcade game of 1990 in Japan and the year's highest-grossing arcade conversion kit in the United States. The Super NES version also sold  cartridges worldwide. It spawned the Final Fight series, followed by several sequels. Its development team later worked on the original Street Fighter II, and some of the characters from Final Fight later appeared as playable fighters in other entries of the franchise, such as the Street Fighter Alpha sub-series.

Gameplay

Final Fight can be played by up to two players simultaneously. Before the game begins, the player chooses between the three main characters: Haggar, Cody, and Guy. Each has his own fighting style and attributes. Health gauges are displayed for both player and enemy characters.

The controls for Final Fight consist of an eight-way joystick and two buttons for attacking and jumping respectively. Pressing the attack button repeatedly when attacking an enemy or multiple enemies will cause the player character to perform a combo. The final blow of the combo can be changed to a throw if the player moves the joystick in the opposite direction just before landing it. The player can also perform jump attacks. Pressing the attack and jump buttons simultaneously allows the player to perform a special attack that strikes all surrounding enemies, but will drain a small portion of the player's health.

Enemies can be grabbed simply by walking into one of them. When an enemy is grabbed, the player can perform a grab attack by pressing the attack button or perform a throw by tilting the joystick left or right. A thrown enemy can be tossed at another for additional damage. Items such as weapons, health recovery items, and items awarding extra points can be picked up by standing over one and pressing the attack button. Weapons have limited uses and will disappear if the player is disarmed by an enemy too much or when the player moves to a new area.

Final Fight consists of six stages or "rounds", as well as two bonus rounds. Each round takes place in a different section of Metro City such as the Slums and the Subway, with most rounds featuring more than one level. At the end of each round the player will face a boss character unique to that round.

Plot
The game is set in a fictional city on the Atlantic coast in the United States named Metro City (analogous with New York City). According to the game's intro, in the 1990s (or 1989 in the Japanese version), the city's crime rate reached alarming levels, but since the election of pro wrestler turned politician Mike Haggar as the new Mayor, Metro City was changed and cleaned up drastically. Under his term, Haggar managed to suppress the crime rate of the city to its lowest points. While the citizens of Metro City were thankful for Haggar's hard work in curbing crime, the Mad Gear Gang, who had served as the dominant criminal organization of Metro City, would not go down so easily. Under the leadership of the crooked businessman Belger, the group attempted to bribe Haggar with a large payoff to keep him from going after them, to which Haggar refused. Still determined to bring Haggar under their rule like the last mayor before him, Mad Gear proceeded to kidnap his daughter Jessica and create further unrest among the citizens. When Haggar finds out about his daughter's abduction, he becomes furious and decides to take his fight against Mad Gear to a personal level. Seeking additional manpower, Haggar recruits Cody Travers: an expert fighter and Jessica's boyfriend, as well as Guy: a ninja in training and Cody's good friend/rival. The three dedicate themselves to the complete eradication of the Mad Gear Gang, and to rescue Jessica from their clutches.

The game gained notoriety for its unique continue screen, where the player character is shown tied to a chair with a bundle of dynamite on the table in front of him; the character struggles to escape as the 10-second time limit counts down. If the player activates the continue option, a knife falls from the ceiling, disconnecting the fuse from the bomb.

Development
The game was designed by Akira Nishitani, and produced by Yoshiki Okamoto. When coming up with the game's concept, Okamoto cited the arcade game Double Dragon II: The Revenge (1988) as his basis for Final Fight. The game was originally shown at trade shows under the title of Street Fighter '89. According to Okamoto, the sales division of Capcom originally requested a Street Fighter sequel, so his team decided to promote Final Fight as a Street Fighter sequel at trade shows (going as far to refer to one of the main characters as a "former Street Fighter"). The title was changed to Final Fight before its official release after feedback from operators stating that the game was nothing like Street Fighter.

According to the developers, they were originally planning to have Ryu and Ken Masters from the original Street Fighter as the main protagonists, but that idea was scrapped for a new plot and new settings, involving the kidnapping of an attractive young woman by a city gang. Capcom's president wanted the team to develop the game as if it was a film, so he made the team watch a number of films. Nishitani's team then approached the "planning and design as if it were a movie."

The street gang the player faces in the game, the Mad Gear Gang, takes their name from the 1987 overhead racing game Mad Gear by Capcom; the game was released as Led Storm outside Japan. Many of the characters are named after 1980s rock musicians such as Axl Rose (Axl), Slash (Slash), Gene Simmons (Simons), Sid Vicious (Sid), Billy Idol (Billy), King Diamond (Abigail, named after King Diamond's second album, also dons facepaint similar to King Diamond's), Sodom (Sodom), Roxy Music (Roxy), The Damned (Damnd) and Poison (Poison), with another, 2P (Two.P), being from the Capcom game Forgotten Worlds. Hugo Andore, another notable enemy character, is based on André the Giant. Because Capcom believed that "players would feel bad beating up a woman", they noted in the manual that the female opponent Poison was a "newhalf".

The soundtrack was the work of seven sound composers: Manami Matsumae, Yoshihiro Sakaguchi, Harumi Fujita, Junko Tamiya, Yasuaki Fujita (in his first work for Capcom), Hiromitsu Takaoka and Yoko Shimomura. Despite this, Sakaguchi is the only composer credited in the game (as "Youkichan's Papa"). The other six were confirmed as having worked on Final Fight in 2014 when the Clarice Disk imprint of City Connection released the Final Fight Original Sound Collection, which featured the original soundtracks to the three original Final Fight games and its accompanying ports.

In a 2007 interview, Retro Gamer magazine asked Akira Nishitani about the game's similarities to the 1984 film Streets of Fire. Nishitani said that, at the time, the team were not "aware of Streets of Fire, but I've Googled it and there does indeed seem to be something familiar about it" but that "this style of story was very popular back then" and many "fighting games made use of it" so "I guess we were part of that crowd!"

Home versions

Super NES (Final Fight and Final Fight Guy)

A port of Final Fight for the Super Nintendo Entertainment System was released as a launch title for the platform in Japan in 1990 and later in North America in 1991 and then in the PAL region in 1992. It was released for the Wii's Virtual Console service in 2007 and the Wii U's Virtual Console in 2013. The SNES port removed the two-player co-op option, the Industrial Area level and playable character Guy. Most of the scene transitions were also edited out. In the arcade version, the player characters would be seen exiting the levels and breaking through doors unlike the SNES version. Due to hardware limitations the SNES version could only display two or three enemies on-screen, in contrast to the CPS arcade version, which could display up to nine or ten enemies on-screen; to make up for this difference, the SNES version features more stopping points than the arcade version and the enemy placement is vastly different.

The English localization of the SNES port was censored for its content and features several differences from its Japanese Super Famicom counterpart: the first two bosses, Damnd and Sodom, were renamed Thrasher and Katana respectively; Belger's wheelchair was redrawn to look like an office chair; Poison, a woman with pink hair, and Roxy, a woman with red hair, were replaced with two male enemies named Billy and Sid; all alcoholic references were removed, with two health-recovering items replaced; the line "Oh! My God", spoken by an enemy when his car is destroyed during the first bonus stage, was changed to "Oh! My Car"; the blood splash effect shown when a character is stabbed was replaced by a generic explosion; and some of the darker skinned enemy characters were given lighter skin tones. The original soundtrack was ported for the Super NES by Toshio Kajino (credited as "Bull").

A revised edition of the SNES port, titled Final Fight Guy, was released in Japan in 1992. This version replaced Cody with Guy as a selectable character (with a new opening and ending sequence explaining Cody's absence), included four difficulty settings, and added other new features such as two new power-ups, although the Industrial Area stage and the Two-Player mode were still omitted. An American version of the game (featuring the same changes in the localization as in the first game) was released in June 1994 as a rental-only game that was initially available at Blockbuster stores, although it was later given a limited release. Kajino's music port was retained for that version.

U.S. Gold versions
U.S. Gold released ports of Final Fight for the Amiga, Atari ST, Commodore 64, ZX Spectrum and Amstrad CPC for the European market in 1991. These ports were developed by Creative Materials. In February 1993, the ZX Spectrum version was released as part of the Super Fighter compilation with Pit Fighter and WWF WrestleMania.

X68000
The Sharp X68000 version was released by Capcom exclusively in Japan on July 17, 1992. This version is a relatively close conversion of the arcade game, with the only notable changes being different music (with a choice between a MIDI soundtrack and one using the X68000's internal sound chip) and a lower maximum on-screen enemies. The game came packaged with a CD soundtrack with all new remixed tunes.

Mega-CD/Sega CD (Final Fight CD)
The Mega-CD/Sega CD version, titled Final Fight CD, was ported by A Wave and published by Sega under license from Capcom in 1993. This version retains nearly all the features of the arcade game that were removed in the two SNES ports (namely the two-player mode, the Industrial Area stage and the ability to play as any of the three main characters) and adds voice acting to the game's opening and ending sequences, an arranged version of the original soundtrack, and an exclusive time attack mode. However the maximum number of on-screen enemies were still lower than the arcade version and the combo attacks of Cody and Guy are much slower. Furthermore, the graphics suffered from a more limited color palette, as well as fewer background details. Like the SNES version, the Mega-CD version was censored for the English localization with many of the same changes. Poison and Roxy were kept, but were redrawn with less revealing clothing.

Game Boy Advance (Final Fight One)
The Game Boy Advance version that was developed by Sun-Tec, titled Final Fight One, was released in 2001. Final Fight One features all three characters and the Industrial Area stage that was missing from the SNES version. The 2-player cooperative mode is also featured via link cable. Dialogue scenes prior to each boss battle have been added and the Street Fighter Alpha 3 renditions of Cody and Guy are featured as hidden playable characters. Other unlockable features include alternate palettes for each player character and the ability for two players to use the same character. The character and background designs are lifted from the SNES versions rather than the original arcade version, with the enemy placement being similar to Final Fight Guy, although the maximum number of on-screen enemies was increased and all the transition sequences were restored. The same new power-up items introduced in Final Fight Guy are also present in this version, along with a new Cody doll item. The English localization of the game featured the same changes as the two SNES versions.

Capcom Classics Collection
Final Fight is included in the 2005 compilation Capcom Classics Collection Volume 1 for the PlayStation 2 and Xbox and in the 2006 portable version Capcom Classics Collection Remixed for the PlayStation Portable. The game is emulated from the original CP System arcade version and features very little differences from the arcade game. The compilation includes tips, character profiles, an art gallery and a sound test as bonus features.

Final Fight: Streetwise
The arcade version is also included as a hidden bonus game in the 2006 game Final Fight: Streetwise for the PlayStation 2 and Xbox. However, the emulation in this version was programmed by Ultracade, rather than Digital Eclipse (the developers of Capcom Classics Collection series). The controls cannot be adjusted and the quality is lower than other emulated versions.

Final Fight: Double Impact
The arcade version of Final Fight was released in a two-in-one bundle titled Final Fight: Double Impact, alongside the arcade game Magic Sword, released digitally for Xbox 360 and PlayStation 3. Added features include various graphic filters, including an arcade cabinet view; online drop-in multiplayer; an arranged soundtrack composed by Simon Viklund; and extra content such as concept art, fan art, Street Fighter comic pages featuring Final Fight characters and the "Final Fight" episode of the Street Fighter animated series, which are unlocked by completing certain in-game challenges. The game was ported and developed by Proper Games and released for Xbox Live Arcade for 800 Microsoft points and April 15, 2010, for PlayStation Network for $9.99. The PS3 version features a very restrictive DRM protection which circumvents the ability other PSN games have to be shared among several PSN accounts. The DRM protection was met with a negative response as it had not been disclosed previous to the game's release. On March 27, 2012, Double Impact was released as part of the Capcom Digital Collection for the Xbox 360.

iOS
On September 15, 2011, Final Fight was released into Apple's iTunes Store. This version includes all three characters from the Arcade version, a multiplayer feature that can only be used with Wi-Fi and a special items where one can turn on Extra Lives, Super Special, and Meat Explosion. However, the game no longer became available after the latest iOS updates from Apple.

Capcom Beat 'Em Up Bundle
In 2018, Final Fight was re-released alongside Captain Commando, The King of Dragons, Knights of the Round, Warriors of Fate, Armored Warriors and Battle Circuit in Capcom Beat 'Em Up Bundle for PlayStation 4, Xbox One, Nintendo Switch and Microsoft Windows.

Reception

Commercial
In Japan, Game Machine listed Final Fight on their January 15, 1990 issue as being the second most successful table arcade cabinet of the month. It went on to be the highest-grossing arcade game of 1990 in Japan (according to the annual Gamest charts), as well as Japan's second highest-grossing arcade game of 1991 (just below Street Fighter II).

Overseas, the game had a successful launch in North America and Europe. In the United States, it was a blockbuster hit, becoming the top-grossing new video game on the RePlay arcade charts in February 1990, and then the top-grossing software conversion kit for eight months in 1990, from March to April, then from June to October, and then December. During November and December, weekly coin drop earnings averaged $183.50 per kit. It ended the year as America's highest-grossing arcade conversion kit of 1990. Final Fight sold a total of 30,000 arcade units worldwide.

The Super NES version was also a commercial success. It sold 1.5 million copies worldwide, becoming one of Capcom's best-selling games on the platform.

Critical
The game was acclaimed by critics. Mega magazine compared the Mega CD version of the game favorably against the incomplete and "poor" Super NES version and placed it top of their list of the best Mega CD games of all time. The four reviewers of Electronic Gaming Monthly declared it a strong conversion of a game with "solid fighting action", though two of them also commented that "the necessity of the CD is questionable at best."

Bran D. Butter reviewed the SNES version, giving it a generally favorable review, calling it a "classy beat 'em" and praising the "superb" graphics. However, the review criticized missing features from the arcade original, including the lack of two-player, missing levels, and the missing player character Guy. On release of the Game Boy Advance version of the game, Famitsu magazine scored it a 31 out of 40.

Accolades
In the February 1991 issue of the Japanese coin-operated video game magazine Gamest, Final Fight took the No. 1 spot as the Best Game of 1990 in the 4th Annual Grand Prize. Final Fight also won the category of Best Action Game, placed No. 4 in Best Video Game Music, No. 9 in Best Graphics, No. 2 in Best Direction, and No. 5 in Best Album. The character Mike Haggar was displayed on the cover of this issue, who took the No. 1 spot in the Top 50 Characters of the year, with Guy in second place, Cody at No. 7, Poison at No. 26, Sodom at No. 33 and Jessica at No. 40. In a 1991 Gamest reader poll, Final Fight was voted the second best arcade game of all time, just below Valkyrie no Densetsu (1990).  In 1995, Total! ranked the game 87th on its Top 100 SNES Games writing: "Tragically, it's missing one of the main characters but this was still a stonking conversion."

Crash gave the ZX Spectrum port a "Crash Smash" award. MegaTech gave the Sega Mega-CD port a "Hyper Game" award.

Retrospective

In 1997, Nintendo Power ranked the SNES version as the 97th best game on any Nintendo platform. Retro Gamer included it among top ten Mega CD games, describing it as "arguably the best home console conversion (aside from recent emulated ports)" of "unquestionably the quintessential arcade hit of the late Eighties." IGN ranked the SNES version 100th on their Top 100 SNES Games of All Time. In 2018, Complex ranked Final Fight 87th on their "The Best Super Nintendo Games".

Legacy

Final Fight was followed by a few sequels. The total sales of the Final Fight series have totaled 3.4 million units for home systems.

Notes

References

External links
 Final Fight at MobyGames
 
 Rage Quitter 87's Final Fight Shrine

1989 video games
CP System games
Amiga games
Amstrad CPC games
Arcade video games
Capcom beat 'em ups
Capcom Power System Changer games
Commodore 64 games
Cooperative video games
Fighting games
Final Fight games
Game Boy Advance games
IOS games
Multiplayer and single-player video games
Video games about ninja
PlayStation Network games
Side-scrolling beat 'em ups
Sega CD games
X68000 games
Super Nintendo Entertainment System games
Transgender-related video games
Censored video games
U.S. Gold games
Video games developed in Japan
Video games scored by David Lowe
Video games scored by Harumi Fujita
Video games scored by Manami Matsumae
Video games scored by Simon Viklund
Video games scored by Yasuaki Fujita
Video games scored by Yoko Shimomura
Video games set in 1989
Video games set in the 1990s
Video games set in the United States
Video games with alternative versions
Virtual Console games
Virtual Console games for Wii U
Xbox 360 Live Arcade games
ZX Spectrum games
J2ME games